USS Repose has been the name of more than one United States Navy ship, and may refer to:

, a hospital ship in commission from 1902 to 1910 and sold in 1919, renamed USS Repose in 1918 while out of commission
, a hospital ship in commission from May 1945 to January 1950, from October 1950 to December 1954, and from October 1965 to May 1970

Repose